Peter Carr (born 22 January 1963) is a former international speedway rider from England.

Speedway career 
Carr reached the final of the British Speedway Championship on two occasions in 1987 and 1993. He rode in the top tier of British Speedway from 1979 to 2005, riding for various clubs. He was also the British Under 21 Champion and a World Under 21 finalist.

Family
His brother Louis Carr was also a speedway rider.

References 

Living people
1963 births
British speedway riders
Belle Vue Aces riders
Birmingham Brummies riders
Edinburgh Monarchs riders
Ellesmere Port Gunners riders
Hackney Hawks riders
Hull Vikings riders
Newcastle Diamonds riders
Sheffield Tigers riders
Stoke Potters riders